Thomas Street may refer to:

People

 Thomas Street (astronomer) (1621–1689), English astronomer
 Thomas Street (judge) (1625–1696), English judge and politician
 Thomas Clark Street (1814–1872), lawyer, businessman and political figure in Ontario, Canada

Streets
 Thomas Street, Dublin, Ireland
 Thomas Street, Limerick, Ireland
 Thomas Street, Perth, Australian
 Thomas Street (St. Louis), United States

Street, Thomas